The following is a list of notable deaths in November 2010.

Entries for each day are listed alphabetically by surname. A typical entry lists information in the following sequence:

 Name, age, country of citizenship at birth, subsequent country of citizenship (if applicable), reason for notability, cause of death (if known), and reference.

November 2010

1
Tom Allison, 89, English footballer.
Mihai Chițac, 81, Romanian general, Minister of Interior (1989–1990), after long illness.
Julia Clements, 104, English flower arranger and author.
Monica Johnson, 64, American novelist and screenwriter (Lost in America, Modern Romance), esophageal cancer.
Herbert Krug, 73, German equestrian, Olympic gold medalist (1984), amyotrophic lateral sclerosis.
Ed Litzenberger, 78, Canadian ice hockey player (Chicago Blackhawks).
Charlie O'Donnell, 78, American announcer (Wheel of Fortune), heart failure.
Shannon Tavarez, 11, American actress (The Lion King), leukemia.
Gaston Vandermeerssche, 89, Belgian partisan, leader of World War II Dutch underground intelligence, subject of Gaston's War, natural causes.
Diana Wellesley, Duchess of Wellington, 88, British aristocrat and intelligence officer.

2
Bhikari Bal, 81, Indian singer.
Rudolf Barshai, 86, Russian conductor and viola player.
Sarah Doron, 88, Israeli politician and government minister.
Andy Irons, 32, American professional surfer.
Clyde King, 86, American baseball player (Brooklyn Dodgers, Cincinnati Reds) and manager (New York Yankees).
Romualdas Krikščiūnas, 80, Lithuanian Roman Catholic prelate, Bishop and Apostolic Administrator of Panevėžys (1973–1983).
Kalim Sharafi, 85, Indian Bengali language singer.
Jule Sugarman, 83, American educator, creator and director of the Head Start Program, cancer.
Sumiko Watanabe, 93, Japanese Olympic sprinter.
Ken Yuasa, 95, Japanese World War II surgeon, heart failure.

3
Petros Hanna Issa Al-Harboli, 64, Iraqi Chaldean Catholic Bishop of Zakho (since 2001).
Kees Bakker, 79, Dutch zoologist.
Alfons Benedikter, 92, Austrian politician.
Jerry Bock, 81, American musical theater composer (Fiddler on the Roof, Fiorello!), heart failure.
Kenneth Brown, 77, American academic, chairman of first undergraduate peace studies program in the United States (1980–2005).
Karen Chandler, 87, American singer.
Viktor Chernomyrdin, 72, Russian politician, Prime Minister (1992–1998), Ambassador to Ukraine (2001–2009), cancer.
Jim Clench, 61, Canadian bass guitarist (April Wine, Bachman–Turner Overdrive), lung cancer.
Bill Colvin, 75, Canadian Olympic bronze medal-winning (1956) ice hockey player.
Hotep Idris Galeta, 69, South African jazz pianist, composer and lecturer, asthma attack.
Purushottama Lal, 81, Indian writer.
Sonia Pottinger, 79, Jamaican record producer.
Pentti Uotinen, 79, Finnish Olympic ski jumper.
Dudley Williams, 73, British biochemist.

4
Sparky Anderson, 76, American baseball player and manager (Cincinnati Reds, Detroit Tigers), member of Baseball Hall of Fame, complications from dementia.
Raúl Chávez, 71, Mexican footballer.
Ron Cockerill, 75, English footballer (Grimsby Town, Huddersfield Town), natural causes.
Jean Compagnon, 94, French Army General and author.
Ophelia Alcantara Dimalanta, 76, Filipino poet, hypertension.
Antoine Duquesne, 69, Belgian politician.
Viola Fischerová, 75, Czech poet and translator.
James Freud, 51, Australian vocalist and bassist (Models) and solo artist, suicide.
John Greene, 90, American football player (Detroit Lions), after short illness.
Michelle Nicastro, 50, American singer, actress (When Harry Met Sally...) and voice actress (The Swan Princess), lung cancer.
Rudy Regalado, 67, Venezuelan percussionist and bandleader (El Chicano), complications of pneumonia.
Charles Reynolds, 78, American magician, liver cancer.
Noel Taylor, 97, American Emmy Award-winning costume designer.
Aleksandr Zõbin, 59, Soviet Olympic sailor.

5
Martin Baum, 86, American talent agent (Creative Artists Agency), President of ABC Pictures (1968–1971).
Jutta Burggraf, 58, German Roman Catholic theologian and professor (University of Navarre).
Antonio Cárdenas Guillén, 48, Mexican drug lord, shot.
Jill Clayburgh, 66, American actress (An Unmarried Woman, Ally McBeal, Dirty Sexy Money), chronic leukemia.
Hajo Herrmann, 97, German Luftwaffe bomber pilot and lawyer.
Charles McDowell, 84, American journalist and syndicated columnist, complications from a stroke.
Midge the Sea Lion, 25, American sea lion (Oklahoma City Zoo), euthanized.
Randy Miller, 39, American drummer (The Myriad), bone cancer.
Rozsika Parker, 64, British art historian and psychotherapist, cancer.
Adrian Păunescu, 67, Romanian author, poet and politician.
Martin Starkie, 87, British actor and writer.
David Steuart, 94, Canadian politician, Saskatchewan MLA (1962–1977) and Leader of the Opposition (1971–1976), Senator (1975–1991).
Henriette van Lynden-Leijten, 60, Dutch diplomat, cancer.
Shirley Verrett, 79, American operatic mezzo-soprano, heart failure.

6
Fernando Bastos de Ávila, 92, Brazilian Roman Catholic priest, Vice-Chancellor (Pontifícia Universidade Católica), member of Academy of Letters, cancer.
Ezard Haußmann, 75, German actor, cancer.
Peter Hilton, 87, British mathematician.
Walter Isard, 91, American economist, founder of regional science.
Jo Myong-rok, 82, North Korean military official, First Vice-chairman of the National Defense Commission (since 2009), heart disease.
Motoichi Kumagai, 101, Japanese photographer.
Robert Lipshutz, 88, American politician, White House Counsel (1977–1979).
Siddhartha Shankar Ray, 90, Indian politician, Chief Minister of West Bengal (1972–1977), Governor of Punjab (1986–1989), renal failure.
Michael Seifert, 86, Soviet-born Nazi war criminal, complications from a fall.
Jay Van Noy, 82, American baseball player (1951 St. Louis Cardinals).

7
Kurt Baier, 93, Austrian philosopher.
George Estock, 86, American baseball player (Boston Braves).
Chris Goudge, 75, British Olympic athlete.
Domingo Maza Zavala, 88, Venezuelan economist, President of the Central Bank of Venezuela (1997–2004).
Yoshinobu Nishizaki, 75, Japanese anime producer (Space Battleship Yamato), fall from boat.
Smaro Stefanidou, 97, Greek actress, heart failure.
Hedy Stenuf, 88, Austrian Olympic figure skater.

8
András Ádám-Stolpa, 89, Hungarian tennis, basketball and ice hockey player.
Gregorio Barradas Miravete, 28, Mexican politician, Mayor-elect of Rodríguez Clara, Veracruz, shot.
Richard Bing, 101, German-born American cardiologist.
Fred Blankemeijer, 84, Dutch footballer.
Philip Carlo, 61, American crime author, amyotrophic lateral sclerosis.
Quintin Dailey, 49, American basketball player (Chicago Bulls, Los Angeles Clippers, Seattle SuperSonics), cardiovascular disease.
Disque Deane, 89, American financier, pneumonia.
Jack Levine, 95, American artist.
Sam Holmes, 94, American Negro league baseball player.
Emilio Eduardo Massera, 85, Argentine admiral, member of the 1976 Argentine coup d'état, cardiovascular arrest.
Addison Powell, 89, American actor (Dark Shadows, The Thomas Crown Affair, Three Days of the Condor).
Mikhail Savitsky, 88, Belarusian painter.
George Solomos, 85, American editor and writer.
Jean White, 69, British pastor and missionary, pancreatic cancer.
Tim Womack, 76, English footballer (Derby County, Workington).

9
Elizabeth Carnegy, Baroness Carnegy of Lour, 85, British academic and life peer.
John Cunneen, 78, New Zealand Roman Catholic prelate, Bishop of Christchurch (1995–2007).
Robin Day, 95, British furniture designer.
Robert Donatucci, 58, American politician, member of the Pennsylvania House of Representatives (since 1980), sleep apnea.
Reginald Hollis, 78, Canadian Anglican prelate, Bishop of Montreal (1975–1990).
Albert Wesley Johnson, 87, Canadian civil servant, President of Canadian Broadcasting Corporation (1975–1982), after long illness.
Ektor Kaknavatos, 90, Greek poet.
Amos Lavi, 57, Israeli actor, lung cancer.
Herman Liebaers, 91, Belgian linguist.
Rolf Pettersson, 84, Swedish ice hockey player.
Lursakdi Sampatisiri, 91, Thai businesswoman and politician, first female Minister of Transport (1976–1977).

10
Georges Aeschlimann, 90, Swiss cyclist.
Mustafa Altıntaş, 71, Turkish footballer, cancer.
Dino De Laurentiis, 91, Italian film producer (Dune, Army of Darkness, Conan the Barbarian).
Theo Doyer, 54, Dutch Olympic field hockey player, amyotrophic lateral sclerosis.
Jim Farry, 56, Scottish football administrator, Chief Executive of the Scottish Football Association (1990–1999), heart attack.
Phillip Hoffman, 80, American surfer, pulmonary disease.
Donald S. Kellermann, 83, American journalist and opinion researcher, liver cancer.
Andreas Kirchner, 57, German Olympic gold (1984) and bronze (1980) medal-winning bobsledder.
Attila Kovács, 70, Hungarian Olympic fencer.
Tiger Lance, 70, South African cricketer, injuries sustained in a traffic collision.
James Munnik, 57, South African cricketer.
Dave Niehaus, 75, American sportscaster (Seattle Mariners), 2008 Ford C. Frick Award recipient, heart attack.
Nicolo Rizzuto, 86, Italian-born Canadian mafia leader (Rizzuto crime family), shot.
Einar Sæter, 92, Norwegian triple jumper, resistance member, newspaper editor and writer.

11
Pankaj Advani, 45,  Indian film director, editor, screenwriter, photographer, theatre director, and painter, cardiac arrest.
Carlos Edmundo de Ory, 87, Spanish poet, leukemia.
John Elliott, 66, American football player (New York Jets), cancer.
Daud Ibrahim, 63, Malaysian Olympic cyclist.
Carroll Pratt, 89, American sound engineer, pioneer of laugh track, natural causes.
Marie Osborne Yeats, 99, American silent movie actress.

12
Des Alwi, 82, Indonesian historian, businessman, and public intellectual, adopted son of Mohammad Hatta, heart failure.
Stanisław Bobak, 54, Polish Olympic ski jumper.
Ernst von Glasersfeld, 93, Austrian-born American philosopher (radical constructivism).
Henryk Górecki, 76, Polish composer (Symphony of Sorrowful Songs), after long illness.
William Hohri, 83, American activist, source behind Civil Liberties Act of 1988, Alzheimer's disease.
Theodore W. Kheel, 96, American labor negotiator.
Karl Plutus, 106, Estonian jurist and centenarian.

13
Noah Augustine, 39, Canadian indigenous leader, road incident.
Farid Baghlani, 41–42, Iranian serial killer and rapist, hanged.
Luis García Berlanga, 89, Spanish film director, natural causes.
George Binks, 96, American baseball player (Washington Senators, Philadelphia Athletics).
Winfried Brugger, 60, German academic lawyer.
Jim Deane, 82, Australian football player.
Norman Dennis, 81, British sociologist, leukaemia.
Witold Hatka, 71, Polish politician, traffic collision.
Ken Iman, 71, American football player (Green Bay Packers, Los Angeles Rams).
W. Henry Maxwell, 75, American politician and Baptist minister.
Claudio Obregón, 75, Mexican actor, respiratory failure.
Nathan Oliveira, 81, American painter.
D. V. S. Raju, 81, Indian film producer, short illness.
Allan Sandage, 84, American astronomer, pancreatic cancer.
Richard Van Genechten, 80, Belgian cyclist.

14
Hal Bamberger, 86, American baseball player (New York Giants).
Sir Gordon Bisson, 91, New Zealand jurist.
Vincent Broderick, 90, English cricketer.
Lew Carpenter, 78, American football player (Detroit Lions, Green Bay Packers, Philadelphia Eagles).
Eugenio Galliussi, 95, Italian cyclist.
Akira Mikazuki, 89, Japanese legal scholar and Minister of Justice.
Wes Santee, 78, American Olympic track athlete (1952 Summer Olympics), cancer.
Bobbi Sykes, 67, Australian Aboriginal rights activist.

15
Helen Boehm, 89, American businesswoman, complications from cancer and Parkinson's disease.
Ángel Cabrera, 71, Uruguayan footballer.
Nikol Ġużeppi Cauchi, 81, Maltese Roman Catholic prelate, Bishop of Gozo (1972–2005).
Moira Deady, 88, Irish actor (The Riordans, Glenroe).
Edmond Amran El Maleh, 93, Moroccan writer and intellectual.
Larry Evans, 78, American chess grandmaster and author, complications following gallbladder operation.
*Paul Jiang Taoran, 84, Chinese Roman Catholic prelate, Bishop of Zhengding, heart disease.
Toswel Kaua, 63, Solomon Islands politician, Deputy Prime Minister (2007), after long illness.
Nimr al-Khatib, c. 92, Palestinian educator and writer.
Ed Kirkpatrick, 66, American baseball player (California Angels, Kansas City Royals, Pittsburgh Pirates), throat cancer.
Maria Dolors Maestre i Pal, 80–81, Andorran philanthropist.
W. Howard Lester, 75, American businessman, former CEO of Williams-Sonoma, Inc., cancer.
Sir Cassam Moollan, 84, Mauritian Chief Justice (1982–1988).
Imre Polyák, 78, Hungarian Greco-Roman wrestler.
Hugh Prather, 72, American self-help author, apparent heart attack.
William Edwin Self, 89, American actor and television production manager (Batman, Lost in Space, Voyage to the Bottom of the Sea), heart attack.

16
Louis Bisdee, 100, Australian politician, member of the Tasmanian Legislative Council (1959–1981).
Paul Calello, 49, American investment banker, non-Hodgkin's lymphoma.
Britton Chance, 97, American biochemist, biophysicist and Olympic sailor.
Ronni Chasen, 64, American publicist (Hans Zimmer, Michael Douglas), shot.
Ragnhild Magerøy, 90, Norwegian writer.
Donald Nyrop, 98, American CEO of Northwest Airlines (1954–1976), Administrator of the Federal Aviation Administration.
Mimi Perrin, 84, French jazz singer and pianist.
Ilie Savu, 90, Romanian footballer and coach, hepatic cirrhosis.
Wyngard Tracy, 58, Filipino talent manager, stroke.
Wong Tin-lam, 83, Chinese screenwriter, producer, director and actor, organ failure.

17
Giorgi Arsenishvili, 68, Georgian mathematician and politician, myocardial infarction.
Olavo Rodrigues Barbosa, 87, Brazilian footballer.
Isabelle Caro, 28, French anorexic model.
Johnny Simpson, 88, New Zealand rugby player.
N. Viswanathan, 81, Indian actor, heart attack.

18
Freddy Beras-Goico, 69, Dominican television producer, comedian, writer and actor, gastric cancer.
Jochem Bobeldijk, 90, Dutch Olympic sprint canoer.
Jim Cruickshank, 69, Scottish footballer.
Brian G. Marsden, 73, British astronomer, after long illness.
Donald Mitchell, 55 Australian weightlifter.
Abraham Serfaty, 84, Moroccan pro-democracy activist.
Dito Shanidze, 73, Georgian Olympic silver medal-winning (1968, 1972) weightlifter.
Gaye Stewart, 87, Canadian ice hockey player.
Mackenzie Taylor, 32, British comedian, suicide.

19
75 Cents, 77, Croatian singer (Eurovision Song Contest 2008).
Pat Burns, 58, Canadian ice hockey coach (Montreal Canadiens, New Jersey Devils), lung cancer.
Byron Duckenfield, 93, British World War II Air Force pilot.
Piotr Hertel, 74, Polish composer.
Jamuna Nishad, 57, Indian politician, traffic collision.
Ole Bjørn Støle, 60, Norwegian judge.
Bob Wheeler, 58, American Olympic athlete.
Atama Zedkaia, 79, Marshallese tribal leader, paramount chief of Majuro.

20
Mir Shawkat Ali, 83, Bangladesh general.
Laurie Bembenek, 52, American convicted murderer, liver and kidney failure.
Roxana Briban, 39, Romanian soprano, apparent suicide.
Santha Devi, 85, Indian actress.
Chalmers Johnson, 79, American scholar and author.
Rob Lytle, 56, American football player (Michigan Wolverines, Denver Broncos), heart attack.
Robert Earl Maxwell, 86, American judge.
Danny McDevitt, 78, American baseball player (Brooklyn Dodgers).
Little Smokey Smothers, 71, American blues guitarist and singer, natural causes.
Ruth Springford, 89, Canadian actress (5 Card Stud, Hangin' In), after short illness.
Heinz Weiss, 89, German actor (The Great Escape).
Jim Yardley, 64, English cricketer.

21
José Antônio Rezende de Almeida Prado, 67, Brazilian composer and pianist, pulmonary edema.
Rosaura Andreu, 92, American actress.
Theodore Bibb, 92, American jazz drummer.
Willis Burks II, 75, American actor (King of California, Law & Order).
Silverio Cavazos, 41, Mexican politician, Governor of Colima (2005–2009), shot.
Takaharu Kondo, 66, Japanese jurist, member of the Supreme Court, pneumonia.
Steve Kuczek, 85, American baseball player (Boston Braves).
Norris Church Mailer, 61, American author and model, gastrointestinal cancer.
David Nolan, 66, American political activist, Libertarian Party founder, stroke.
Prince Chunk, 10, American obese cat, heart disease.
Margaret Taylor-Burroughs, 95, American museum founder (DuSable Museum of African American History).
Raghavan Thirumulpad, 90, Indian Ayurvedic scholar and physician.

22
Kenneth Burton, 84, British biochemist.
Jean Cione, 82, American baseball player (Rockford Peaches).
Frank Fenner, 95, Australian scientist.
Julien Guiomar, 82, French film actor.
David Lam, 87, Canadian politician, Lieutenant Governor of British Columbia (1988–1995), prostate cancer.
Len Lunde, 74, Canadian ice hockey player (Detroit Red Wings, Chicago Blackhawks, Edmonton Oilers), heart condition.
Winston Murray, 69, Guyanese politician, former Deputy Prime Minister, and Minister of Trade, Tourism and Industry.
Urbano Navarrete Cortés, 90, Spanish Roman Catholic priest, Cardinal since 2007.
Tom Underwood, 56, American baseball player (Philadelphia Phillies, New York Yankees, Oakland A's), pancreatic cancer.

23
Mauro Alice, 84, Brazilian film editor, pneumonia.
Nassos Daphnis, 96, Greek-born American artist, Alzheimer's disease.
Wolfgang Hellrigl, 69, German philatelist.
Joyce Howard, 88, British actress (The Night Has Eyes, They Met in the Dark), natural causes.
Pavel Lednyov, 67, Russian modern pentathlete.
Ingrid Pitt, 73, Polish-born British actress (The Vampire Lovers, Countess Dracula, Where Eagles Dare), heart failure.
Kananginak Pootoogook, 75, Canadian Inuit artist, complications from surgery.
Don Samuel, 86, American football player.
James Tyler, 70, American lutenist.
George Otto Wirz, 81, American Roman Catholic prelate, Auxiliary Bishop of Madison (1977–2004).

24
Thomas J. Ahrens, 74, American geophysicist.
Peter Christopherson, 55, British musician (Coil, Throbbing Gristle) and graphic artist (Hipgnosis), natural causes.
Annie Lee Cooper, 100, American civil rights activist.
A. Arthur Giddon, 101, American lawyer and jurist.
Huang Hua, 97, Chinese politician, Foreign Minister (1976–1982).
Valentin Ivakin, 80, Russian footballer and football manager.
Lim Chong Eu, 91, Malaysian politician, Chief Minister of Penang (1969–1990).
Molly Luft, 66, German prostitute, cancer.
Michael Samuels, 90, British philologist.
Andy Schoettle, 77, American Olympic sailor.
Sergio Valech, 83, Chilean Roman Catholic prelate, Auxiliary Bishop of Santiago de Chile (1973–2003).
Norm Winningstad, 85, American technology entrepreneur, founder of Floating Point Systems, suicide.

25
Charlie Atkinson, 77, English footballer, ill-health following a fall .
Alfred Balk, 80, American journalist, former editor of the Columbia Journalism Review, cancer.
Tony Dixon, 52, Irish disc jockey and blogger, after short illness. (death announced on this date)
Bernard Matthews, 80, British businessman (Bernard Matthews Farms).
Doris McCarthy, 100, Canadian artist.
James Morrison, 68, American politician, member of the Kansas House of Representatives (1992–2010).
Yaroslav Pavulyak, 62, Ukrainian poet.
Colin Slee, 65, British Church of England prelate, Dean of Southwark Cathedral, pancreatic cancer.
Ann Southam, 73, Canadian composer.

26
Gavin Blyth, 41, British television producer, cancer.
R. N. DeArmond, 99, American historian.
James DiPaola, 57, American politician, Massachusetts House of Representatives (1993–1996), Sheriff of Middlesex County (1996–2010), suicide by gunshot.
Mohammad Anwar Elahee, 81, Mauritian footballer and manager.
Maria Hellwig, 90, German yodeler and folk musician.
Palle Huld, 98, Danish actor, believed to be inspiration for Tintin.
Umanosuke Iida, 49, Japanese animator (Nausicaä of the Valley of the Wind, Castle in the Sky, Hellsing), lung cancer.
Paraska Korolyuk, 71, Ukrainian political activist (Orange Revolution).
Mario Pacheco, 60, Spanish music producer and photographer.
Kevin Parry, 77, Australian businessman, traffic collision.
Purcell Powless, 84, American tribal leader, chairman of the Oneida Nation of Wisconsin (1967–1990).
Marjory Saunders, 97, Canadian Olympic archer.
Vitthal Umap, 80, Indian musician.

27
Steve Hill, 70, English footballer.
Irvin Kershner, 87, American film director (The Empire Strikes Back, Never Say Never Again), lung cancer.
Bill Werle, 89, American baseball player (Pirates, Cardinals, Red Sox).

28
Jon D'Agostino, 81, Italian-born American comic book artist (Archie), bone cancer.
Syoziro Asahina, 97, Japanese entomologist.
Keir Clark, 100, Canadian politician, Prince Edward Island MLA for 3rd Kings (1948–1959; 1966–1970).
Samuel T. Cohen, 89, American physicist, inventor of the neutron bomb, cancer.
Cal Emery, 73, American baseball player and coach.
Giorgos Fountas, 86, Greek actor, Alzheimer's disease.
Svante Granlund, 89, Swedish ice hockey player.
Frank Hanna, 86, Australian rules footballer.
Vladimir Maslachenko, 74, Russian footballer, winner of the 1960 European Nations' Cup.
Gil McDougald, 82, American baseball player (New York Yankees), prostate cancer.
Katsuya Miyahira, 92, Japanese martial artist.
Leslie Nielsen, 84, Canadian-born American actor (Airplane!, The Naked Gun, Forbidden Planet), pneumonia.
Gene Polito, 92, American cinematographer (Futureworld, Up in Smoke, Lost in Space), esophageal cancer.
Mahaveer Prasad, 71, Indian politician, after long illness.
Renato Terra, 87, Italian actor and poet.

29
Bella Akhmadulina, 73, Russian poet.
Irena Anders, 90, Polish stage actress and singer.
El Hijo de Cien Caras, 34, Mexican professional wrestler, shot.
David Fleming, 70, British environmental writer
John Gerrish, 100, American composer.
Richard Goldman, 90, American philanthropist, founder of the Goldman Environmental Prize.
Bob Holcomb, 88, American politician, Mayor of San Bernardino, California (1971–1985, 1989–1993), heart failure.
Silvester Knipfer, 70, German Olympic sports shooter.
Pete Langelle, 93, Canadian ice hockey player (Toronto Maple Leafs).
John Mantle, 64, Scottish Episcopalian prelate, Bishop of Brechin (2005–2010).
Al Masini, 80, American television producer, creator of Entertainment Tonight, Solid Gold and Star Search, melanoma.
Mario Monicelli, 95, Italian film director, suicide by jumping.
Steven Posner, 67, American corporate raider, boat collision.
Majid Shahriari, Iranian quantum physicist, car bomb.
Stephen Solarz, 70, American politician, U.S. Representative from New York (1975–1993), esophageal cancer.
Sir Maurice Wilkes, 97, British computer scientist.

30
Idris Ali, 70, Egyptian author.
Daya Mata, 96, American spiritual leader, Self-Realization Fellowship president (1955–2010).
Garry Gross, 73, American fashion photographer, heart attack.
Peter Hofmann, 66, German operatic tenor, dementia and Parkinson's disease.
Jim Kelley, 61, American sportswriter and television journalist (Sports Illustrated), pancreatic cancer.
Gabriela Kownacka, 58, Polish actress (Rodzina zastępcza), breast cancer.
Robert Potter, 101, British architect, Surveyor to the Fabric of St Paul's Cathedral
Imre Sátori, 73, Hungarian footballer.
Dave Skrien, 81, American CFL football player (Roughriders, Blue Bombers) and coach (BC Lions, Roughriders), complications from Alzheimer's disease.
Ted Sorel, 74, American actor (Guiding Light, Law & Order), complications from Lyme disease.
R. C. Stevens, 76, American baseball player (Pittsburgh Pirates, Washington Senators).
Monty Sunshine, 82, British clarinetist (Chris Barber Orchestra).

References

2010-11
 11